Frau und Hund ("Woman and Dog") is a German magazine of art, poetry and related subjects, including politics, published thrice yearly by painter Markus Lüpertz and edited by writer G.H. Holländer. The subtitle "Zeitschrift für kursives Denken" ("Journal of Diagonal Thinking") plays on the German term for italics ("kursiv") and the German equivalent of (dis)course, Kurs as opposed to Diskurs.

The magazine was first published in 2003 on occasion of the ART BASEL and distributed to visitors of the fair; a supplement entirely published in Italian was presented at the German Academy of Villa Massimo, Rome, on 1 April 2004, while a similar French version was presented at the Centre Pompidou, Paris, on 29 November 2006. Overall, ten regular issues have been published until the beginning of 2007.

Featured authors
 Frank Stella
 Brenton Broadstock
 Moni Ovadia
 Valentino Zeichen
 Piero Falchetta
 Jean-Claude Lebensztejn
 Benoît Gréan 
 Jean Marois
 Anouk Jevtić
 László Krasznahorkai
 Yuri Averbakh
 Zlatko Krasni
 Heinrich Steinfest
 Durs Grünbein
 Daniel Spoerri
 Jörg Immendorff

There are hardly any reviews of periodicals in the German press. The magazine was, however, reviewed twice by the Frankfurter Allgemeine Zeitung, once in 2004 and once in 2006. Die Welt published an extract from issue 8, accompanied by a short characterization of the reviews aims, in November 2006.

References

External links
 
 review of Frau und Hund

2003 establishments in Germany
Visual arts magazines published in Germany
German-language magazines
Magazines established in 2003
Triannual magazines